The United States' Lindsay Davenport defeated Spain's Arantxa Sánchez Vicario in the final, 7–6(10–8), 6–2 to win the gold medal in Women's Singles tennis at the 1996 Summer Olympics. In the bronze-medal match, the Czech Republic's Jana Novotná defeated the United States' Mary Joe Fernández, 7–6(10–8), 6–4. Sánchez Vicario became the second woman to win multiple Olympic tennis medals in singles (following Steffi Graf in 1988 and 1992); Fernández would have done so as well, but the rules had been changed since the last Games to add a bronze medal playoff match.

The tournament was held from 23 July to 2 August at the Stone Mountain Tennis Center, in Atlanta, Georgia of the United States of America. There were 64 competitors from 34 nations, with each nation having up to 3 players.

Jennifer Capriati was the defending champion from 1992, but she chose not to participate.

Background

This was the eighth appearance of the women's singles tennis. A women's event was held only once during the first three Games (only men's tennis was played in 1896 and 1904), but has been held at every Olympics for which there was a tennis tournament since 1908. Tennis was not a medal sport from 1928 to 1984, though there were demonstration events in 1968 and 1984.

Returning from the 1992 Games were both bronze medalists, Arantxa Sánchez Vicario of Spain and Mary Joe Fernández of the United States, as well as all four of the quarterfinal losers. Silver medalist (and 1992 champion) Steffi Graf was kept out by a knee injury. The U.S. team was strong even without defending champion Jennifer Capriati, with #1 seed Monica Seles, Fernandez, and Lindsay Davenport. Spain also send a strong team, with Sánchez Vicario joined by Conchita Martínez as the next two seeds behind Seles.

Belarus, Chinese Taipei, Croatia, the Czech Republic, the Dominican Republic, Luxembourg, Russia, Slovakia, and Tunisia each made their debut in the event. France and Great Britain each made their seventh appearance, tied for most among nations to that point.

Competition format

The competition was a single-elimination tournament, but with a significant change from 1988 and 1992. A bronze-medal match was held, unlike the previous two Games. Matches were best-of-three sets. The 12-point tie-breaker continued be used in any set, except the third, that reached 6–6.

Schedule

All times are Eastern Daylight Time (UTC-4)

Seeds

Draw

Finals

Top half

Section 1

Section 2

Bottom half

Section 3

Section 4

References 

 ITF Olympic site

Women's Singles
1996 in women's tennis
Women's events at the 1996 Summer Olympics